In grammar, the allative case (abbreviated ; from Latin allāt-, afferre "to bring to") is a type of locative grammatical case. The term allative is generally used for the lative case in the majority of languages that do not make finer distinctions.

Finnish
In the Finnish language (Uralic language), the allative is the fifth of the locative cases, with the basic meaning of "onto". Its ending is -lle, for example pöytä (table) and pöydälle (onto the top of the table). In addition, it is the logical complement of the adessive case for referring to "being around the place". For example, koululle means "to the vicinity of the school". With time, the use is the same: ruokatunti (lunch break) and ... lähti ruokatunnille ("... left to the lunch break"). Some actions require the case, e.g. kävely - mennä kävelylle "a walk - go for a walk". It also means "to" or "for", for example minä (me) and minulle (to/for me).

The other locative cases in Finnish and Estonian are these:
Inessive case ("in")
Elative case ("out of")
Illative case ("into")
Adessive case ("on")
Ablative case ("from off")

Baltic languages
In the Lithuanian and Latvian languages the allative had been used dialectally as an innovation since the Proto-Indo-European, but it is almost out of use in modern times. Its ending in Lithuanian is -op which was shortened from -opi, whereas its ending in Latvian is -up. In the modern languages the remains of the allative can be found in certain fixed expressions that have become adverbs, such as Lithuanian išėjo Dievop ("gone to God", i.e. died), velniop! ("to hell!"), nuteisti myriop ("sentence to death"), rudeniop ("towards autumn"), vakarop ("towards the evening"), Latvian mājup ("towards home"), kalnup ("uphill"), lejup ("downhill").

Greek
In Mycenaean Greek, a -de ending is used to denote an allative, when it is not being used as an enclitic, e.g. te-qa-de, *Tʰēgʷasde, "to Thebes". This ending survives into Ancient Greek in words such as Athḗnaze, from accusative Athḗnās + -de.

Biblical Hebrew
In Biblical Hebrew the so-called directional he (or he locale) in the form of ה ָ– /-ɔh/ suffixed to nouns (often place names) also functions as an allative marker, usually translated as 'to' or 'toward'.

Wanyi
Wanyi, an endangered Australian language, had the allative suffixes -kurru/wurru.

Latin
The Latin accusative of towns and small islands is used for motion towards in a way that is analogous to the allative case.

Udmurt 
In the Udmurt language, words inflected with the allative (often called "approximative" in Permic languages) case ending "-лань" /ɫɑɲ/ express the direction of a movement.

Further reading

References

Grammatical cases